Fill In the Blank may refer to:
"Fill in the Blanks", a song by Ringo Starr from his 2010 album Y Not
"Fill in the Blank", a 2013 single by Greg Bates
"Fill in the Blank", a single by Car Seat Headrest from their 2016 album Teens of Denial
Cloze test, a language test in which blank spaces in the text must be filled in

See also
Fill in the Bank, a Philippine game show broadcast on TV5